Kate Kelly is an American politician who served as Idaho State Senator from the Ada County-based District 18 from 2004 to 2010. She is a member of the Democratic Party.

Career 
In January 2009, she succeeded Senator Clint Stennett of Ketchum as Idaho Senate minority leader after Stennett's announcement that he would miss all of the 2009 legislative session while battling brain cancer.

Kelly was previously the assistant minority leader in the Idaho Senate, Deputy Attorney General for the State of Idaho, and a senior manager at the Idaho Department of Environmental Quality.

In December 2010, she became the Director of the Office of Ecosystems, Tribal & Public Affairs at the Environmental Protection Agency's Region 10 office in Seattle.

Elections 
She did not seek re-election in 2010 and cited financial restrictions as her reasoning for her retirement from public office.

Kelly has stated that she raised approximately $80,000 in funding each time she campaigned for election and re-election.

2004 
Kelly was unopposed in the Democratic primary. She defeated Republican nominee Dave Baumann in the general election with 54.9% of the vote.

2006 
Kelly was unopposed in the Democratic primary. She defeated Republican nominee Brad Bolicek in the general election with 63.01% of the vote.

2008 
Kelly was unopposed in the Democratic primary. She defeated Republican nominee Dean E. Sorensen in the general election with 59.5% of the vote.

References

External links
Project Vote Smart – Senator Kate Kelly (ID) profile
Follow the Money – Kate Kelly
 2004, 2006, 2008 campaign contributions

Year of birth missing (living people)
Living people
Place of birth missing (living people)
Boise State University alumni
Democratic Party Idaho state senators
People from Boise, Idaho
George Mason University alumni
S.J. Quinney College of Law alumni
University of Idaho alumni
University of Virginia Darden School of Business alumni
Women state legislators in Idaho
21st-century American women